Sassy Justice is a web series created by Trey Parker, Matt Stone and Peter Serafinowicz that uses deepfake technology to insert unrelated celebrities and politicians into the fictional world of a television reporter. The first episode was posted to YouTube on October26, 2020.

Production and development 
The series was created by the newly-formed Deep Voodoo studio, made up of over twenty computer graphics artists. The team was originally assembled for a film project that was interrupted due to the COVID-19 pandemic, who made the video based on a series of impressions that Serafinowicz developed of a "sassy" Donald Trump. The first video, which featured deepfakes of Donald Trump and Mark Zuckerberg, went viral after airing on television and YouTube in 2020. The creators have a handful of shorter videos alongside a 15-minute first episode that may be turned into an ongoing series, film, or other type of project.

Sassy Justice started filming for a second show in Cheyenne, Wyoming between August 23rd and August 27th 2021. Multiple filming locations were observed including locations in downtown, midtown, and north Cheyenne. A holiday special was released in December 2020.

Premise
The series follows reporter Fred Sassy of Cheyenne, Wyoming (played by Peter Serafinowicz, whose face is superimposed with a deepfake of Donald Trump) who investigates the news itself, including the dangers posed by media manipulation and fake news.

Reception and impact
Mark Frauenfelder of BoingBoing considers the first episode "terrific deepfake satire".

In 2022, Parker and Stone received $20 million in funding for their deepfake studio Deep Voodoo based on this short.

Celebrities deepfaked
Julie Andrews as Louise "Lou" Xiang, a computer technician; she is actually played by Sarah Alexander
Michael Caine as a fictionalized version of himself (episode 1, actually Serafinowicz)
Al Gore as a fictionalized version of himself (episode 1, actually Parker)
Jared Kushner as a fictionalized version of himself (episode 1, actually Betty Boogie Parker)
Donald Trump as a fictionalized version of himself (episode 1) and Fred Sassy, local investigative reporter; both are in reality Serafinowicz 
Ivanka Trump as a fictionalized version of herself (episode 1, actually Parker)
Chris Wallace as a fictionalized version of himself (episode 1)
Mark Zuckerberg as the Dialysis King of Cheyenne (actually Stone)
Tom Cruise as a fictionalized version of himself (episode 1, actually Parker)

See also
 Borat Subsequent Moviefilm, a 2020 satire film about a fictional reporter
 Spitting Image, a British satirical puppet show that mocks current affairs

References

External links 

 Official YouTube channel

2020 American television series debuts
American satirical television shows
Television shows set in Wyoming
Cheyenne, Wyoming
Cultural depictions of Al Gore
Cultural depictions of Donald Trump
Deepfakes
Works by Trey Parker and Matt Stone